Colacium is a genus of algae belonging to the family Euglenaceae.

The genus has almost cosmopolitan distribution.

Species:

Colacium arbuscula 
Colacium mucronatum 
Colacium sideropus 
Colacium simplex 
Colacium steinii 
Colacium vesiculosum

References

Euglenozoa genera
Taxa named by Christian Gottfried Ehrenberg